Sphaerocarpos is a genus of plants known as bottle liverworts. There are eight or nine species in this genus.

Classification 
Sphaerocarpos is one of two extant genera in the famly Sphaerocarpaceae. The following species are currently recognized:

 Sphaerocarpos cristatus
 Sphaerocarpos donnelli
 Sphaerocarpos drewiae
 Sphaerocarpos hians
 Sphaerocarpos michelii
 Sphaerocarpos muccilloi
 Sphaerocarpos stipitatus
 Sphaerocarpos texanus

References

External links 

Sphaerocarpales
Liverwort genera